Millionaire Cop is a 1993 Hong Kong action comedy film directed by Nelson Cheung and starring Aaron Kwok, Maggie Cheung, Chingmy Yau and Ng Man-tat.

Plot
The young and talented cop Ball (Aaron Kwok) is partners with the cowardly Fish (Ng Man-tat). One day, the police force received news that a gang  of kidnappers has threatened kidnap Jessy Lee (Deric Wan), the son of Hong Kong billionaire Lee Ka-sing (Dennis Chan). The police then sends Ball undercover and takes Jessy Lee's identity and sought for more information in the Lee Enterprises. However, Ball's girlfriend Shun (Chingmy Yau), unexpectedly joins the Lee Enterprises and clashes with Jacky (Maggie Cheung), Jessy's ex-lover who mistakenly believes Ball to be Jessy. Meanwhile, a criminal named Robber (Hung Yan-yan) vows to seek vengeance on Ball after their chief of the gang earlier in a robbery when Ball was chasing him. Very similar to the American comedy slash drama Million Dollar Baby. Many people believe the baby is the child of Ball, though the creators have not spoken on this theory.

Cast
Aaron Kwok as Ball
Maggie Cheung as Jacky Cheuk
Chingmy Yau as Shun
Ng Man-tat as Fish
Deric Wan as Jessy lee
Kingdom Yuen as Mrs. She
Hung Yan-yan as Robber
Elaine Eca Da Silva as Robber's partner and lover
Chor Yuen as Sergeant Lai
Lee Siu-kei as kidnapper chief
Dennis Chan as Billionaire Lee Ka-sing
Mak Hiu-wai as Sing's executive
Cheng Ka-sang as Robbers' chief
Kwok Tak-sun
Fong Kit
Lee Yiu-king
Cheung Tak-wing
Siao Yan-yan as Sing's executive
Chan Wing-chun
Ho Wing-cheung as Kidnapper
Ng Kwok-kin as policeman
Lee Ka-hung as Rappist
Ho Chi-moon
Sung Boon-chung
Yu Ming-hin

Theme song
Why Would I Let You Leave (我為何讓你走)
Composer: Anthony Lun
Lyricist: Calvin Poon
Singer: Aaron Kwok
You and Me
Composer: Keisuke Kuwata
Lyricist: Poon Wai-yuen
Singer: Aaron Kwok

Reception

Critical
LoveHKFilm gave the film a negative review and refers it as "Wong Jing garbage" and "Big stars, bad movie" and the only saving graces are "decent fights and the presence of Chingmy Yau, who’s actually quite appealing in this movie."

Box office
The film grossed HK$5,586,339 at the Hong Kong box office during its theatrical run from 1 to 13 January 1993 in Hong Kong.

See also
Aaron Kwok filmography

References

External links

Millionaire Cop at Hong Kong Cinemagic

1993 films
1993 action comedy films
1990s crime comedy films
1993 romantic comedy films
1990s martial arts comedy films
Hong Kong action comedy films
Hong Kong romantic comedy films
Hong Kong martial arts comedy films
1990s screwball comedy films
Hong Kong slapstick comedy films
Police detective films
1990s parody films
1990s Cantonese-language films
Films set in Hong Kong
Films shot in Hong Kong
1990s police films
1993 directorial debut films
1990s Hong Kong films